Sendhwa is a city with a municipal government in Barwani district in the Indian state of Madhya Pradesh. It is the headquarters for Sendhwa Tehsil.

Geography
Sendhwa is located at MH&MP Border . It has an average elevation of 409 metres (1341 feet).

Demographics

As of the 2011 Census of India, Sendhwa had a population of 56,485. Males constitute 52% of the population and females 48%. Sendhwa has an average literacy rate of 63%, higher than the national average of 59.5%: male literacy is 70%, and female literacy is 55%. In Sendhwa, 17% of the population is under 6 years of age.

References

Cities and towns in Barwani district